In organic chemistry, hydroformylation, also known as oxo synthesis or oxo process, is an industrial process for the production of aldehydes from alkenes. This chemical reaction entails the net addition of a formyl group and a hydrogen atom to a carbon-carbon double bond. This process has undergone continuous growth since its invention: production capacity reached 6.6 tons in 1995. It is important because aldehydes are easily converted into many secondary products. For example, the resulting aldehydes are hydrogenated to alcohols that are converted to detergents. Hydroformylation is also used in speciality chemicals, relevant to the organic synthesis of fragrances and drugs. The development of hydroformylation is one of the premier achievements of 20th-century industrial chemistry.

The process entails treatment of an alkene typically with high pressures (between 10 and 100 atmospheres) of carbon monoxide and hydrogen at temperatures between 40 and 200 °C. In one variation, formaldehyde is used in place of synthesis gas. Transition metal catalysts are required. Invariably, the catalyst dissolves in the reaction medium, i.e. hydroformylation is an example of homogeneous catalysis.

History
The process was discovered by the German chemist Otto Roelen in 1938 in the course of investigations of the Fischer–Tropsch process. Aldehydes and diethylketone were obtained when ethylene was added to an F-T reactor. Through these studies, Roelen discovered the utility of cobalt catalysts. HCo(CO)4, which had been isolated only a few years prior to Roelen's work, was shown to be an excellent catalyst. The term oxo synthesis was coined by the Ruhrchemie patent department, who expected the process to be applicable to the preparation of both aldehydes and ketones. Subsequent work demonstrated that the ligand tributylphosphine (PBu3) improved the selectivity of the cobalt-catalysed process.  The mechanism of Co-catalyzed hydroformylation was elucidated by Richard F. Heck and David Breslow in the 1960s.

In 1968, highly active rhodium-based catalysts were reported. Since the 1970s, most hydroformylation relies on catalysts based on rhodium. Water-soluble catalysts have been developed.  They facilitate the separation of the products from the catalyst.

Mechanism

Selectivity
A key consideration of hydroformylation is the "normal" vs. "iso" selectivity. For example, the hydroformylation of propylene can afford two isomeric products, butyraldehyde or isobutyraldehyde:

These isomers reflect the regiochemistry of the insertion of the alkene into the M–H bond. Since both products are not equally desirable (normal is more stable than iso), much research was dedicated to the quest for catalyst that favored the normal isomer.

Steric effects 
Markovnikov's rule addition of the cobalt hydride to primary alkenes is disfavored by steric hindrance between the cobalt centre and the secondary alkyl ligand. Bulky ligands exacerbate this steric hindrance. Hence, the mixed carbonyl/phosphine complexes offer a greater selectivity for anti-Markovnikov addition, thus favoring straight chain products (n-) aldehydes.  Modern catalysts rely increasingly on chelating ligands, especially diphosphites.

Electronic effects 
Additionally, electron-rich the hydride complex are less proton-like. Thus, as a result, the electronic effects that normally favour the Markovnikov addition to an alkene are less applicable. Thus, electron-rich hydrides are more selective.

Acyl formation
To suppress competing isomerization of the alkene, the rate of migratory insertion of the carbonyl into the carbon-metal bond of the alkyl must be relatively fast. The rate of insertion of the carbonyl carbon into the C-M bond is likely to be greater than the rate of beta-hydride elimination.

Asymmetric hydroformylation
Hydroformylation of prochiral alkenes creates new stereocenters. Using chiral phosphine ligands, the hydroformylation can be tailored to favor one enantiomer. Thus, for example, dexibuprofen, the (+)−(S)-enantiomer of ibuprofen, can be produced by enantioselective hydroformylation followed by oxidation.

Processes 
The industrial processes vary depending on the chain length of the olefin to be hydroformylated, the catalyst metal and ligands, and the recovery of the catalyst. The original Ruhrchemie process produced propanal from ethene and syngas using cobalt tetracarbonyl hydride. Today, industrial processes based on cobalt catalysts are mainly used for the production of medium- to long-chain olefins, whereas the rhodium-based catalysts are usually used for the hydroformylation of propene. The rhodium catalysts are significantly more expensive than cobalt catalysts. In the hydroformylation of higher molecular weight olefins the separation of the catalyst from the produced aldehydes is difficult.

BASF-oxo process 
The BASF-oxo process starts mostly with higher olefins and relies on cobalt carbonyl-based catalyst. By conducting the reaction at low temperatures, one observes increased selectivity favoring the linear product. The process is carried out at a pressure of about 30 MPa and in a temperature range of 150 to 170 °C. The cobalt is recovered from the liquid product by oxidation to water-soluble Co2 +, followed by the addition of aqueous formic or acetic acids. This process gives an aqueous phase of cobalt, which can then be recycled. Losses are compensated by the addition of cobalt salts.

Exxon process 
The Exxon process, also Kuhlmann- or PCUK – oxo process, is used for the hydroformylation of C6–C12 olefins.  The process relies on cobalt catalysts. In order to recover the catalyst, an aqueous sodium hydroxide solution or sodium carbonate is added to the organic phase. By extraction with olefin and neutralization by addition of sulfuric acid solution under carbon monoxide pressure the metal carbonyl hydride can recovered. This is stripped out with syngas, absorbed by the olefin, and returned to the reactor. Similar to the BASF process, the Exxon process is carried out at a pressure of about 30 MPa and at a temperature of about 160 to 180 °C.

Shell process 
The Shell process uses cobalt complexes modified with phosphine ligands for the hydroformylation of C7–C14 olefins. The resulting aldehydes are directly hydrogenated to the fatty alcohols, which are separated by distillation, which allows the catalyst to be recycled. The process has good selectivity to linear products, which find use as feedstock for detergents. The process is carried out at a pressure of about 4 to 8 MPa and at a temperature range of about 150–190 °C.

Union Carbide process 
The Union Carbide (UCC) process, also known as low-pressure oxo process (LPO), relies on a rhodium catalyst dissolved in high-boiling thick oil, a higher molecular weight condensation product of the primary aldehydes, for the hydroformylation of propene. The reaction mixture is separated in a falling film evaporator from volatile components. The liquid phase is distilled and butyraldehyde is removed as head product while the catalyst containing bottom product is recycled to the process. The process is carried out at about 1.8 MPa and 95–100 °C.

Ruhrchemie/Rhone–Poulenc process 

The Ruhrchemie/Rhone–Poulenc process (RCRPP) relies on a rhodium catalyst with water-soluble TPPTS as ligand (Kuntz Cornils catalyst) for the hydroformylation of propene. The tri-sulfonation of triphenylphosphane ligand provides hydrophilic properties to the organometallic complex. The catalyst complex carries nine sulfonate-groups and is highly soluble in water (about 1 kg L−1), but not in the emerging product phase. The water-soluble TPPTS is used in about 50-fold excess, whereby the leaching of the catalyst is effectively suppressed. Reactants are propene and syngas consisting of hydrogen and carbon monoxide in a ratio of 1.1:1. A mixture of butyraldehyde and isobutyraldehyde in the ratio 96:4 is generated with few by-products such as alcohols, esters and higher boiling fractions. The Ruhrchemie/Rhone-Poulenc-process is the first commercially available two-phase system in which the catalyst is present in the aqueous phase. 
In the progress of the reaction an organic product phase is formed which is separated continuously by means of phase separation, wherein the aqueous catalyst phase remains in the reactor.

The process is carried out in a stirred tank reactor where the olefin and the syngas are entained from the bottom of the reactor through the catalyst phase under intensive stirring. The resulting crude aldehyde phase is separated at the top from the aqueous phase. The aqueous catalyst-containing solution is re-heated via a heat exchanger and pumped back into the reactor. The excess olefin and syngas is separated from the aldehyde phase in a stripper and fed back to the reactor. The generated heat is used for the generation of process steam, which is used for subsequent distillation of the organic phase to separate into butyraldehyde and isobutyraldehyde. Potential catalyst poisons coming from the synthesis gas migrate into the organic phase and removed from the reaction with the aldehyde. Thus there is no accumulation of catalyst poisons, and the elaborate fine purification of the syngas can be omitted.

A plant was built in Oberhausen in 1984, which was debottlenecked in 1988 and again in 1998 up to a production capacity of 500,000 t/a butanal. The conversion rate of propene is 98% and the selectivity to n-butanal is high. During the life time of a catalyst batch in the process less than 1 ppb rhodium is lost.

Laboratory process
Recipes have been developed for the hydroformylation on a laboratory scale, e.g. of cyclohexene.

Substrates other than alkenes
Cobalt carbonyl and rhodium complexes catalyse the hydroformylation of formaldehyde and ethylene oxide to give hydroxyacetaldehyde and 3-hydroxypropanal, which can then be hydrogenated to ethylene glycol and propane-1,3-diol, respectively. The reactions work best when the solvent is basic (such as pyridine).

In the case of dicobalt octacarbonyl or Co2(CO)8 as a catalyst, pentan-3-one can arise from ethene and CO, in the absence of hydrogen. A proposed intermediate is the ethylene-propionyl species [CH3C(O)Co(CO)3(ethene)] which undergoes a migratory insertion to form [CH3COCH2CH2Co(CO)3]. The required hydrogen arises from the water shift reaction. For details, see

If the water shift reaction is not operative, the reaction affords a polymer containing alternating carbon monoxide and ethylene units. Such aliphatic polyketones are more conventionally prepared using palladium catalysts.

Functionalized olefins such as allyl alcohol can be hydroformylated. The target product 1,4-butanediol and its isomer is obtained with isomerization free catalysts such as rhodium-triphenylphosphine complexes. The use of the cobalt complex leads by isomerization of the double bond to n-propanal. The hydroformylation of alkenyl ethers and alkenyl esters occurs usually in the α-position to the ether or ester function.

The hydroformylation of acrylic acid and methacrylic acid in the rhodium-catalyzed process leads to the Markovnikov product in the first step. By variation of the reaction conditions the reaction can be directed to different products. A high reaction temperature and low carbon monoxide pressure favors the isomerization of the Markovnikov product to the thermodynamically more stable β-isomer, which leads to the n-aldehyde. Low temperatures and high carbon monoxide pressure and an excess of phosphine, which blocks free coordination sites, can lead to faster hydroformylation in the α-position to the ester group and suppress the isomerization.

Side- and consecutive reactions

Alkenes 
Side reactions of the alkenes are the isomerization and hydrogenation of the double bond. While the alkanes resulting from hydrogenation of the double bond do not participate further in the reaction, the isomerization of the double bond with subsequent formation of the n-alkyl complexes is a desired reaction. The hydrogenation is usually of minor importance; However, cobalt-phosphine-modified catalysts can have an increased hydrogenation activity, where up to 15% of the alkene is hydrogenated.

Aldehydes 
A usually desired consecutive reaction is the hydrogenation of the aldehydes to alcohols. Higher temperatures and hydrogen partial pressures favor the hydrogenation of the resulting aldehyde to the alcohol. For the reaction mechanism it is believed that the aldehyde initially forms a CO-π-complex with the catalyst. This is rearranged to the alkoxide complex and by subsequent oxidative addition of hydrogen the alcohol is eliminated and the starting complex is formed.

The aldehydic carbon-oxygen double bond can also be subject to hydroformylation, which leads to formic acid and its esters. The reaction requires the carbon monoxide insertion into the oxygen-metal bond of the alkoxide complex. The resulting formyl complex can converted into the formic acid esters and the starting complex by oxidative addition of hydrogen. The initially produced aldehydes can react further by aldol condensation to either target product precursors like 2-ethylhexenal or higher molecular weight condensation products, so-called thick oil.

Catalyst and ligands 
Conditions for hydroformylation catalysis can induce degradation of supporting organophosphorus ligands. Triphenylphosphine is subject to hydrogenolysis, releasing benzene and diphenylphosphine. The insertion of carbon monoxide in an intermediate metal-phenyl bond can lead to the formation of benzaldehyde or by subsequent hydrogenation to benzyl alcohol. One of the ligands phenyl-groups can be replaced by propene, and the resulting diphenylpropylphosphine ligand can inhibit the hydroformylation reaction due to its increased basicity.

References

Further reading
"Applied Homogeneous Catalysis with Organometallic Compounds: A Comprehensive Handbook in Two Volumes (Paperback) by Boy Cornils (Editor), W. A. Herrmann (Editor). 
"Rhodium Catalyzed Hydroformylation" P. W. N. M. van Leeuwen, C. Claver Eds.; Springer; (2002). 
"Homogeneous Catalysis: Understanding the Art" by Piet W. N. M. van Leeuwen Springer; 2005. 
 Imyanitov N.S./ Hydroformylation of Olefins with Rhodium Complexes // Rhodium Express. 1995. No 10–11 (May).  pp. 3–62 (Eng). 

Organometallic chemistry
Homogeneous catalysis
Formylation reactions
Carbon monoxide